Mixozercon is a genus of mites in the family Zerconidae. There are about six described species in Mixozercon.

Species
These six species belong to the genus Mixozercon:
 Mixozercon albertaensis
 Mixozercon borealis
 Mixozercon heterosetosus Balan, 1995
 Mixozercon jasoniana
 Mixozercon sellnicki (Schweitzer, 1948)
 Mixozercon stellifer Aoki, 1964

References

Zerconidae
Articles created by Qbugbot